The 4th Division was a unit of the Finnish Army during the Winter War. It was part of the II Corps (II AK) which fought on the Karelian Isthmus. The 4th Division was responsible for the front between the Gulf of Finland and Viipuri.

Commanders 
 B. Nordenswan ( – 6 December 1939)
 A. Kaila (6 December 1939 – 1 March 1940)
 J. Arajuuri (1 March 1940 – ? )

External links

Finnish wartime photos and history website Stories by veterans, historians, and wartime pictures from the KevOs4 unit of the 4th Division .
The Battles of the Winter War comprehensively covered by Sami H. E. Korhonen

Military units and formations of Finland in the Winter War
Divisions of Finland
Military units and formations of Finland in World War II